Sagehen Creek Field Station is a research and teaching facility of the University of California at Berkeley's Office of the Vice Chancellor for Research, the Berkeley Natural History Museums  & the University of California Natural Reserve System. Sagehen is also a member of the Organization of Biological Field Stations.

The Station was established in 1951 with the signing of a long-term special use permit with the USDA Forest Service; today, this relationship includes the Tahoe National Forest which manages the land, & the Pacific Southwest Research Station, which created the Sagehen Experimental Forest on 28 Nov. 2005.

Sagehen serves as the hub of a much broader network of research areas known as the Central Sierra Field Research Stations. CSFRS consists of:
 Sagehen Creek Field Station
 Central Sierra Snow Laboratory
 Onion Creek Experimental Watershed
 Chickering American Reserve
 North Fork Association Lands

The Station is not generally open to the public. However, Sagehen hosts periodic public events.

Sagehen also maintains a public news blog and video log.

References

External links
Official Sagehen Creek Field Station website
Berkeley Natural History Museums website
California Biodiversity Center website
University of California Natural Reserve System website
Organization of Biological Field Stations website
Sagehen Experimental Forest

University of California Natural Reserve System
Tahoe National Forest
Buildings and structures in Nevada County, California
Protected areas of Nevada County, California
Education in Nevada County, California
University of California, Berkeley
1951 establishments in California